Cape Alevina (Russian: Mys Alevina) is a cape on the northern side of the Sea of Okhotsk. It is on the Koni Peninsula and forms the southeastern point of Taui Bay.

History 

American whaleships hunted bowhead and gray whales off the cape between 1852 and 1866. On 12 July 1851 the ship Houqua (339 tons), Capt. Brown, of New Bedford, was wrecked on the rocks about two miles east of the cape during a fog. Her crew was found on the beach two weeks later by the ship Canton (409 tons), Capt. J. Allen, of the same port, which also salvaged 1,100 of 2,700 bbls of whale oil left aboard the wreck before it broke up. One side of the bows with the night heads – as well as some spars and driftwood – from the wreck were still visible high up on the rocks two years later.

Climate
Cape Alevina has a transitional arctic tundra/subarctic climate (Köppen climate classification  ET/Dfc) with very cold, long winters and short, rather cool summers.

References

Alevina
Landforms of Magadan Oblast
Pacific Coast of Russia
Landforms of the Sea of Okhotsk
Shipwrecks in the Sea of Okhotsk